The eye care system in Ghana can be said to be one in its infant or growing stages. Today there are less than 300 eye care professionals taking care of the eye needs of over 23 million Ghanaians.

History
Since Ghana's independence on March 6, 1957, there has been much work done to promote and improve the eye care needs of Ghanaians. The main groups who are championing this goal now are the Ghana Society of Ophthalmologists, ophthalmic nurses group of ghana and the Ghana Optometric Association.

Regulatory bodies

Ophthalmological Society of Ghana (OSG)
The Ophthalmological Society of Ghana is a professional body of ophthalmologists in Ghana which governs the practice of ophthalmology in Ghana. At its inauguration in 1992, there were only 15 members including several expatriates. As of 2011, their numerical strength has increased to 50 with not less than 5 expatriates. Their objectives include promoting good eye health in Ghana and maintaining professionalism in their profession as ophthalmologists. Their activities include organizing continuous medical education for their members and collaborating with each other and members of other ophthalmological societies around the world to improve patient care. They are associated with the Illinois College of Optometry, the American Academy of Ophthalmology, and the WGA.

Ghana Optometric Association
The Ghana Optometric Association (GOA) is the country's governing body for the optometry profession. Since 2009 all optometrists wanting to be members have been required to write a professional exam. Upon successfully passing the exam, the certification required to practice optometry is awarded. The group has about 200 members. In 2010 the Ghana Optometric Association along with the Kwame Nkrumah University of Science and Technology's Faculty of Distance Learning rolled out a two-year program to offer all members of GOA who did not have the Doctor of Optometry degree to enroll for it.

Nurses and midwives council
The Nurses and midwives council is the statutory body that regulate the activities of ophthalmic nursing practice in Ghana. The ophthalmic nurses group of Ghana is a professional body that serves as the mouth piece of the ophthalmic nurses in Ghana. The group has a membership drive of about 500 nurses spread out across the country. they serve as first point of call in eye care. They also collaborate with other health care professionals in the county to provide eye care service for the teaming populates.

Services
The Ministry of Health through its hospitals and health facilities is the main provider of eye care services in the country. Over the years it has taken various initiatives to train more eye care professionals through the various universities, teaching hospitals, nursing schools, training schools, etc. The aim of the Ministry of Health is to ensure that there is at least one functioning eye unit in every district of the country. Despite the current work, much work is still needed to improve access to eyecare in Ghana due to the low number of eye care professionals per 1000 people. Another group that is helping the Ministry of Health is the Christian Health Association of Ghana. Thirty-five percent of Ghana's health service provision is done by the Christian Health Association of Ghana. Most of the facilities that CHAG runs have eye clinics and these aid in service delivery in those towns and villages that are situated in.

The services that eye care professionals offer are varied and include:
 Cataracts surgery
 Glaucoma surgery
 Refraction
 Rehabilitative care

The chart below shows the number of eye care professionals in the various regions and also the progress made to restore sight to people with Cataracts in 2005.

2005 Eye report of Ghana

Eye care personnel

Cataract Surgeries

Western Ghana 
Despite a population exceeding 2.1 million, the eighteen districts in Ghana's Western Region are among the least resourced in terms of eyecare services. Professional eye care services are available in four districts, Wassa West, Bibiani/Anhwiaso/Bekwai, Ahanta West and Shama Ahanta East Metropolitan.

In 2005 there were five eye care specialists in the region, comprising two ophthalmologists, two optometrists, one optician and an ophthalmic nurse. Specialists operate from the Imperial Eye Care Centre and the SAEMA district hospital in Takoradi, and from the Government Hospitals in Tarkwa and Dixcove. Supporting services are provided by the region's 106 general practitioners. International assistance is offered through Operation Eyesight Universal, which funds three district hospital satellite eye clinics in the Western Region.

Training Schools

Ophthalmologists
Teaching hospitals in Ghana train medical doctors for a period of three to five years in Ophthalmology. A total of at least ten years is needed to train an individual from the Undergraduate level to the level of an Ophthalmologist in Ghana.

Optometrists
The first optometrist school in Ghana started at the department of Physics, Kwame Nkrumah University of Science and Technology in 1992. The first class had just five students and were under the tutelage of Ghana's first Optometrist, Dr. K Monny. It was opened to only to those who had had their first degrees in either Biochemistry, Physics or Biology. Graduates from the school were awarded the Postgraduate Diploma in Optometry (Pg. Dip. Optometry). In 2000, a four-year Bachelor of Science Degree program was started to phase out the Pg. Dip. Optometry program and also accelerate the training of more eye care professionals in Ghana. In 2004, just as the first batch of Optometrist with the BSc. Degree had graduated, they were enrolled for the two-year Doctor of Optometry (O.D) program. They passed out in 2007. In 2002, the University of Cape Coast also rolled out its Doctor of Optometry program. Five students enrolled for the program and graduated with the 2008 batch of O.Ds from KNUST. Today, there are about two hundred Optometrists in Ghana working hand-in-hand with other eye care professionals to save sight.

Ophthalmic nurses
Trained nurses who wish to become ophthalmic nurses undergo a one-year post nursing school training in eye care at the Korle-Bu Teaching Hospital. Their training involves training in detection of eye condition and referring to the right eye care professional for treatment. They also are trained in managing common disease conditions of the eye as well as training to assist the Ophthalmologist in surgery.

Opticians
The Oyoko town in the New Juaben district of the Ashanti Region hosts Ghana's only school for the training of opticians. Secondary school graduates who qualify undergo a three-year training in lens glazing and fitting, optics and a lot more to qualify as an optician. They work closely with Optometrists in refractive therapy and refraction.

Major Eye conditions
There are a lot of ocular conditions in Ghana and as of now virtually all conditions can be treated in the country including those that require laser surgery. Occasionally, though, some conditions require the individual being taken outside the country for treatment. Below are the more common conditions in Ghana.
 Refractive errors
 Cataracts
 Diabetic Retinopathy
 Hypertensive Retinopathy
 Glaucoma
 Bacterial Infections
 Viral Infections
 Agricultural injuries to the eye
 Trauma
 HIV/AIDS associated ocular complications
 Sickle cell retinopathy
 Allergic conjunctivitis

Glaucoma
Ghana is ranked second in worldwide statistics for the prevalence of glaucoma. It is estimated that  600,000 Ghanaians are said to be suffering from glaucoma out of the number, 30,000 are likely to become blind if the disease is left untreated. The statistics continues to show that 8.5 percent of people above 40 years have the disease and 7.7 percent of people above 30 years also are with the disease. The Ghana Health Service (GHS) is the government agency responsible for health care administration and delivery in the country. GHS has over the years initiated various programs aimed at improving the eye care system in the country. In 2008, the day was celebrated under the theme “Eyes on the Future - Fight Vision Impairment in Later Life Now  In Ghana, it is only the Ophthalmologist and optometrist  who are licensed to manage glaucoma.

See also
 Optometry in Ghana
 Department of Optometry, KNUST
 Optometry, UCC, Ghana

References